The Morris House is a historic house at 16428 Arkansas Highway 89 in Lonoke, Arkansas. Its walls are finished in brick and vertical board siding, and it is covered by a gable-on-hip roof which has a clerestory window near the center where the chimney is located. The house was designed by architect Fred Perkins in 1962 for the family of William Henry Morris, a prominent local farmer. It was built in 1963 and is a good local example of Mid-Century Modern architecture.

The house was listed on the National Register of Historic Places in 2019.

See also
National Register of Historic Places listings in Lonoke County, Arkansas

References

Mid-century modern
Houses on the National Register of Historic Places in Arkansas
Houses completed in 1963
Houses in Lonoke County, Arkansas
National Register of Historic Places in Lonoke County, Arkansas
Buildings and structures in Lonoke, Arkansas